Bradford James Cox (born May 15, 1982) is an American singer-songwriter and musician, best known as the lead singer and guitarist of the indie rock band Deerhunter. He also pursues a solo career under the moniker Atlas Sound.

Cox formed Deerhunter with drummer Moses Archuleta in 2001.  The band has released 7 studio albums along with several singles and EPs. Atlas Sound is a name Cox has used since he was ten to refer to his own music, but his first full-length production under the name was Let the Blind Lead Those Who Can See but Cannot Feel (2008). Cox's method of creating music is stream of consciousness, and he does not write lyrics in advance.

He made his film acting debut in 2013's Dallas Buyers Club.

Music career

Deerhunter

Cox founded Deerhunter with bassist Paul Harper and drummer Dan Walton (who named the band) in early 2001. The band expanded after Cox met a teenage transient, Moses Archuleta, who was sleeping on the floor of Cox's friends. Archuleta initially played Ace Tone Organ and electronics. The band's first shows were experimental and based on improvisation. Cox continued recording slightly more structured material and releasing it on CD-R and cassette using the name Atlas Sound. Paul Harper moved to Ohio and was replaced by Justin Bosworth. At this point Colin Mee also joined the band on guitar. Dan Walton left and Cox suggested Archuleta move to drums. The band's live shows and recordings became more song-oriented. They recorded their debut 7" for Die Slaughterhaus. Josh Fauver joined the band in 2004 after Bosworth died in a freak skateboarding accident. This lineup recorded Deerhunter's debut LP on Atlanta label Stickfigure Records. Cox suggested Lockett Pundt, whom he befriended while attending Harrison High School in Kennesaw, Georgia, join the band on guitar so that he could concentrate on vocals and electronics. This lineup recorded their breakthrough record, 2007's Cryptograms until 2010's Halcyon Digest. Colin Mee left the band after failing to show up for a North American tour. Josh Fauver subsequently left the band and was replaced by Josh McKay. The band is now a four piece consisting of Cox on guitar and vocals, Pundt on guitar and occasional vocals, McKay on bass, and Archuleta on drums.

Atlas Sound
Atlas Sound is the musical solo project of Cox, although he has used the name to represent his music since he was a child.  He had access to a cassette player with two tape decks, which he used to layer guitar and drum sounds, and his own voice.  In listening to some of these old tapes (of which Cox believes he has over five hundred in storage) he found "Some of it is absolutely, terrifyingly bad, but sometimes I'm just like, 'Wow, that's cool.' That's actually how some Deerhunter songs happened. 'Spring Hall Convert' [from Cryptograms] was like that. That was a tape I made in ninth or tenth grade."  Cox writes his music stream-of-consciousness, not writing lyrics in advance, and constructing songs by adding more parts until he feels "it's getting crowded." The name of his project is derived from the brand of tape player he used, Atlas Sound.

Cox began Atlas Sound in the wake of his work with Deerhunter because "I have ideas that I can't make work with a five piece rock band...There's kind of this palette of sounds that I use that I don't necessarily get to use with Deerhunter." Because the music Deerhunter makes is a collaborative effort, Cox does not want to assert himself as its principal songwriter.  "I might have an idea for a fragment of a song, but I want to leave it skeletal so the guys can fill it out. Whereas with Atlas Sound, everything is done in an hour."  Cox created the music for his first record in the software Ableton Live, using an array of computer-based instruments, as well as his own live recordings.

To date, there have been four major releases by Cox as Atlas Sound: Let the Blind Lead Those Who Can See but Cannot Feel (2008), Logos (2009), a four-album set of previously unreleased songs called Bedroom Databank (2010), and finally Parallax in 2011. The lyrics of Let the Blind Lead are autobiographical in nature, reflecting life experiences of Cox. In discussing his second album, Cox characterized his first as being a "bedroom laptop type thing" and "Very introverted."  In contrast, Logos was written in several parts of the world, and is "not about me. There are collaborations with other musicians. The lyrics are not autobiographical. The view is a lot more panoramic and less close-up. I became bored with introspection." An unfinished version of Logos was leaked onto the internet in August 2008, over a year before its release date. In response, Cox almost ceased production on the record, later saying "I did not react well to the leak, in retrospect. It became the kind of internet-fueled drama that I was quickly learning to despise."

In late 2010, Cox published four volumes of demos on his blog, entitled "Bedroom Databank". These demos were taken down from Mediafire by Sony, but they later apologized to Cox, stating that the files "were mistakenly removed". Atlas Sound was chosen by Animal Collective to perform at the All Tomorrow's Parties festival that they curated in May 2011.

Other work
Cox has also recorded as part of other bands, such as the short lived "Wet Dreams", an otherwise all-girl garage / noise band in which he played drums. He also recorded several tracks on the Black Lips second album We Did Not Know the Forest Spirit Made the Flowers Grow, playing drums on the song "Notown Blues" from that album.

He also is a part of the "Avant-Garage" band Ghetto Cross, with Cole Alexander from Black Lips, Frankie Broyles, and Asha Lakra.

Cox contributed to the Karen O-scored soundtrack for the 2009 film Where the Wild Things Are.

In November 2012, it was announced that Cox would portray Jared Leto's lover in the feature film, Dallas Buyers Club, co-starring Matthew McConaughey and Jennifer Garner; this is Cox's film debut.

Equipment

Guitars
For the most part, Bradford favors vintage and modern Fender and Gibson guitars. Some of his guitars include:
 Fender Jaguar (1964 Fiesta Red, Formerly owned by Stereolab's Tim Gane)
 Fender Jazzmaster (1966, Block Inlays Originally white, has aged to a yellow color)
 Fender Stratocaster
 '74 Gibson Les Paul Signature
 Fender Bronco (70s stripped natural finish)
 Teisco Del-Rey EV-2, Humbuckers, Blue (possibly modified)
 Various Gibson Acoustics
 EKO 60's 12 String Acoustic
 Epiphone Small Body Acoustic strung in "Nashville Tuning"

Effects and amplifiers
Pedalboard

Bradford Cox's Deerhunter Pedalboard as of 2016 Tours

1966 Fender Jazzmaster into – (signal chain as follows)
 Boss TU-2 Chromatic Tuner
 Fairfield Circuitry Unpleasant Surprise (Used for Lead Parts, Noise)
 Henretta Engineering Chord Blaster (Used For Overdrive)
 Eventide PitchFactor
 Behringer Reverb Machine RV600
 Ibanez CF7 Chorus / Flanger (Rarely Used)
 Ibanez DE7
 Line 6 DL4
 Boss Noise Suppressor
Out to Fender Hot Rod DeVille 4x10

Cox Also Uses an Exposed Spring Reverb Tank / Filter Unit for Noise and Effects

Vocal Effects Pedal Board
Beyerdynamic M69 Mic Into:
 Digitech DigiVerb (through Mic for Backwards Vocals Only)
 Digitech DigiDelay (through Mic for Vocal Loops Only)
 Eventide Mixing Link Pre Amp / FX Loop

Amps
When playing live with Deerhunter, Bradford previously used Univox U-1226 Head into a vintage Marshall 4x10 Cabinet. He has also used a Marshall JCM800 half-stack, and occasionally a 1970s Peavey Classic combo amplifier. He Currently uses a Fender Hot Rod DeVille 410.

Songwriting 
Cox describes his mode of songwriting as 'automatic or stream-of-consciousness'. "Usually I go into a sort of trance and I'll have five or six songs afterwards", he said, speaking to Victoria Segal of Q in November 2010. "What is interesting is seeing how the band adapts them and mutates them into the final product. Lots of accidents and primitive irrational things happen. It can be difficult trying to explain the process to a producer or engineer. They generally want to help you polish things and I tend to want to sabotage that", he added.

Personal life
Cox was born with the genetic condition Marfan syndrome. As a teenager, he dropped out of high school (although he later earned a GED) and his parents divorced, leaving him "to live in my childhood home alone. I literally lived in this large suburban house by myself." Cox has called his changing musical taste while growing up reflective of his life and mental state.  Around the age of ten, his Marfan syndrome began to affect his body in more visible ways; this is the point at which he "first started looking awkward." With no friends, Cox became interested in how music could sound "heartbreaking or nostalgic or melancholy"; he identified with the title character of the film Edward Scissorhands, and especially enjoyed the soundtrack, which was composed by Danny Elfman.  Cox's tastes shifted to music that was more "monotonous or hypnotic", such as the Stereolab album Transient Random-Noise Bursts with Announcements.  Around twenty years of age, his life situation brought about "a period", during which he became "only interested in this certain sort of suburban psychedelic pastoral thing. It was escapism. I didn't want as much emotional manipulation. It's kind of the opposite of Edward Scissorhands."

Cox has described himself as gay, though he previously has stated that he leads a non-sexual/asexual lifestyle. However, in a 2011 interview with Rolling Stone, Cox said that he no longer identifies as asexual but rather as queer: "For a long time I just said I was asexual, but now I just realized that… I'm still, I guess… I mean, I'm queer. I just sort of, don't really have a very big self-esteem, so asexuality is sort of like a comfort zone where you don't get rejected." Cox stated in an October 19, 2016, radio interview: "There's so many types of sexuality, but one that I think is overlooked is to be asexual. I am absolutely asexual. I am a virgin at 34 years old." In 2019, Cox confirmed that he was still a virgin. Cox also identified as non-binary in a 2019 tweet.

In December 2014, Cox was hospitalized after being hit by a car.

Discography

With Deerhunter:
 2005 Turn It Up Faggot
 2007 Cryptograms
 2008 Microcastle
 2008 Weird Era Cont.
 2010 Halcyon Digest
 2013 Monomania
 2015 Fading Frontier
 2019 Why Hasn't Everything Already Disappeared?

As Atlas Sound:
 2008 Let the Blind Lead Those Who Can See but Cannot Feel
 2009 Logos
 2011 Parallax

With Cate Le Bon
 2019 Myths 004

References

External links

 MySpace
 Deerhunter official Facebook page

1982 births
21st-century American singers
4AD artists
Alternative rock guitarists
Alternative rock singers
Ambient musicians
American indie rock musicians
American male singer-songwriters
American rock guitarists
American male guitarists
American rock singers
American rock songwriters
Asexual non-binary people
Queer musicians
Non-binary musicians
Lead guitarists
Living people
Musicians from Atlanta
People with Marfan syndrome
Avant-pop musicians
Ableton Live users
21st-century American guitarists
Guitarists from Georgia (U.S. state)
21st-century American male singers
Singer-songwriters from Georgia (U.S. state)
Deerhunter members